Draddy may refer to:

Draddy Gymnasium a multi-purpose arena in the Bronx, New York
Vincent dePaul Draddy (died 1990), American scholar-athlete at Manhattan College